Sneham is a 1998 Indian Malayalam film,  directed by  Jayaraj. The film stars Jayaram, Jomol, Kasthuri and Biju Menon in the lead roles. The film has musical score by Perumbavoor G. Raveendranath.

Cast
Jayaram as Padmanabhan Nair
Jomol as Manikkutti
Kasthuri as Radhika
Biju Menon as Sasidharan Nair
Siddique as Sivankutty
Lena as Ammu
V. K. Sreeraman as Bhaskaran Mama
Vavachan as Omanakkuttan
Captain Raju
Kunjhukutty Varassiar as Muthassi

Soundtrack

References

External links
 
 

1998 films
1990s Malayalam-language films
Films scored by Perumbavoor G. Raveendranath